The City of Bradford Metropolitan District Council election took place on Thursday 5 May 2011.

Ward results
An asterisk denotes an incumbent.

Baildon ward

Bingley ward

Bingley Rural ward

Bolton & Undercliffe ward

Bowling & Barkerend ward

Bradford Moor ward

City ward

Clayton & Fairweather Green ward

Craven ward

Eccleshill ward

Great Horton ward

Heaton ward

Idle & Thackley ward
Two councillors were elected in this ward, as Cllr. Ed Hall (Liberal Democrats) had resigned, citing personal reasons.

Ilkley ward

Keighley Central ward

Keighley East ward

Keighley West ward

Little Horton ward

Manningham ward
Asama Javed defected from Labour to Respect in March 2015.

Queensbury ward
In June 2011 Lynda Cromie and her husband Paul (also a councillor) left the British National Party citing 'personal reasons'. They now stand as The Queensbury Ward Independents.

Royds ward
In 2008, James Lewthwaite stood in this ward as a British National Party candidate.

Shipley ward

Thornton & Allerton ward

Toller ward

Tong ward

Wharfedale ward
Matt Palmer resigned from the Conservative Party to move to Jersey with his family in 2012. The seat was retained for the party by Jackie Whiteley in a by-election 15th November 2012.

Wibsey ward

Windhill & Wrose ward

Worth Valley ward

Wyke ward

By-elections between 2011 and 2012 elections
Vote changes correspond to the 2011 Council election.

Great Horton ward
This was triggered by the resignation of Cllr. Paul Flowers (Labour Party) who stood down after "adult content" was found on a council computer he had used.

References

2011
Bradford
2010s in West Yorkshire